Michael William Gilbert (born August 17, 1954) is an American music composer working in the genres of electronic music and world music.

Biography
Michael William Gilbert grew up in Connecticut and Brussels, Belgium. While living in Europe he first encountered the music of Varese, Stockhausen, and Pierre Henry, as well as music of India, Africa, and Japan. After studying electrical engineering at MIT, he continued studies in music at the Boston School of Electronic Music, later as a teacher and designer of synthesis systems. He graduated with a degree in music from Hampshire College, and shortly thereafter became the technical director of electronic music studios at Amherst College, Smith College, Hampshire College, and the University of Massachusetts Amherst. He has since taught electronic music at Hampshire College, the University of Massachusetts Amherst, and Holyoke Community College.

MW Gilbert has been composing and recording actively from the 1970's through the present. In 1978 he released his first LP, “Moving Pictures”, with the goal of humanizing electronic music, using wooden flutes, percussion, and voice to complement synthesized sounds and textures. “The Call” (1980), his second LP, grew out of a desire to set jazz-influenced solo lines against a backing of drone, percussion, and soundscapes, also evoking aspects of Eastern music. “The Call” marks MW Gilbert's first work with multi-wind and reed player Tim Moran, experimental percussionist/vocalist David Moss, and acoustic bassist Salvatore Macchia. The LP “In the Dreamtime” (1982) followed and is a refinement of ideas germinated on the first two records. It uses a theme of dream imagery, exploring and merging distinctions between electronics, new jazz, and world music, and features work with Moran, Moss, and Macchia, as well as master drummer Royal Hartigan.

Moving to compact disc as one of the first indies to do so, MW Gilbert released “The Light in the Clouds” (1987), and “Point of Views” (1988). A collaboration with master percussionist Tony Vacca, bassist Salvatore Macchia, and synthesist Roy Finch, “The Light in the Clouds” brings together African, Jewish, Christian, and Shinto music traditions and melds them with crystal clear sounds and rhythms. “Point of Views” is a solo recording realized entirely in his (then new) MIDI/computer-based studio, weaving elements of jazz, world, and electronic into “an ethereal and beautiful blend!” “Point of Views” received 4 stars in Downbeat Magazine. It successfully creates the sound of an ensemble yet is a purely solo work, with only percussion by Tony Vacca on one track. MW Gilbert signed a recording contract with Penta Disc Recordings (WEA) for releases in Canada of music from this repertoire.

After a few long breaks from recording, two new CD projects were released. “Other Voices” (2000), with more collaboration with Tony Vacca and Roy Finch. This was followed by “I Can See from Here” (2010), a complex weave of jazz, folk, electronic soundscape, world music, and electroacoustic ambience. It features a track with guitarist and friend Peter Kaukonen (Black Kangaroo, Jefferson Airplane, Jefferson Starship, Johnny Winter).

MW Gilbert's first three LP recordings, “Moving Pictures”, “The Call”, and “In the Dreamtime” were remastered and rereleased on CD, making the complete catalog to date available again, on both disc and digital distribution channels.

Composed with the aim of creating music for potential live performance, “Secret Stories” (2015) is a complex work encompassing many faces of electronic music old and new, jazz, contemporary classical, and influences from multicultural folk music. He released “Radio Omnibus” (2018), with cutting edge electronic music, two acoustic chamber pieces, and features collaborations with Adam Holzman (Miles Davis, Steven Wilson) and Mark Walker (Oregon, Lyle Mays).

His latest album is “Voice Ping Strum”, a vinyl only release. It has two extended suites, one on each side. It was realized in the studio using Eurorack modular, voice, and piano. It comes on the 40th anniversary of the release of his first album, “Moving Pictures”.

MW Gilbert's music has been played in concerts and festivals in North America and Europe and has been used by choreographers in conjunction with modern dance works, including Susan Waltner, Valerie Feit, Jan Wodynski, and Paula Josa-Jones.

MW Gilbert retired from an almost 30-year career as Adviser for Technology Initiatives and Services for the University of Massachusetts Amherst, having engaged in research on internet media technologies, mobile devices, virtual teaching, strategic planning, and developing/supporting internet and technology cloud services to the campus and community. He is now able to work full time on music and is a co-principal with his son Daniel of Tall Dog Electronics, which has a growing line of Eurorack modules, all used on “Voice Ping Strum”!

Discography
 Moving Pictures (Gibex 001), 1978
 The Call (Gibex 002), 1980
 In The Dreamtime (Palace of Lights 02/2000), 1982
 The Light in the Clouds (Gibex 003), 1986
 Point of Views (Gibex 004), 1988
 Other Voices (Gibex 005), 2000
 I Can See from Here (Gibex 006), 2010
 Secret Stories (Gibex 007), 2015
 Radio Omnibus (Gibex 008), 2018 (with Adam Holzman)
 Voice Ping Strum (Gibex 009), 2019
 The Outside Inside (Gibex 010), 2020 (EP)
 She Looked Back (Gibex 011), 2020 (Single, with Adam Holzman)
 Miles to Go (Gibex 012), 2020 (Single, with Adam Holzman)
 Moving On (Gibex 013), 2021 (Single)
 The Vanished Day (Gibex 014), 2021 (EP)

References

American male composers
21st-century American composers
Living people
University of Massachusetts Amherst faculty
1954 births
21st-century American male musicians